Azaad is a 1955 Indian Hindi-language action comedy film produced and directed by S. M. Sriramulu Naidu. It was the top grossing Hindi film in the year of its release, and one of the biggest Hindi film hits in the decade. In addition, Dilip Kumar won his second Filmfare Award for Best Actor for his work in this movie.

C. Ramchandra was the music director. Hit songs from the movie include "Aplam Chaplam", sung by Lata Mangeshkar and Usha Mangeshkar and "Na Bole Na Bole", sung by Lata Mangeshkar. The movie was a remake of director's own 1954 Tamil film Malaikkallan.

Plot
After her widower father, Kedarnath, passes away, Shobha goes to live with her father's friend Charandas and his wife Shanta, who had their son go missing as a child. Years later, Shobha is now matured and Charandas scouts for a suitable groom. A wealthy man, Sundar, would like to marry Shobha, but the family detests him. Then one night Shobha is abducted. The Police are informed but their search is in vain. A few days later, they get wind that Shobha may be in Sundar's custody, and a search proves to be in vain. Then Shobha returns home and tells them that she was rescued by a wealthy man named Azaad, housed in a mansion, looked after very well and brought back home all in one piece. They subsequently find out that the wealthy man is none other than a notorious bandit named Azaad. They are even more shocked when Shobha informs them that she wants to marry Azaad. Will Charandas and Shanta permit her to marry a bandit?

Cast
 Dilip Kumar as Kumar / Azaad / Abdul Rahim Khan
 Meena Kumari as Shobha
 Pran as Sundar
 Om Prakash as Head Constable Motilal
 Raj Mehra as Sub Inspector
 Randhir as Kedarnath
 Badri Prasad as Charandas
 S. Nazir as Chandar
 Murad as Jagirdar
 Ramesh Sinha, Balam, Nissar as Azaad's People
 Achala Sachdev as Shanta
 Shammi as Janki
 Deepa as Paro
 Sayee as Chanda 
 Subbulakshmi as Gopi
Sayee & Subbulakshmi

Soundtrack
The music was composed by C. Ramchandra and the songs were written by Rajendra Krishna. According to author, musicologist and film critic Rajesh Subramanian, Naushad was first offered to compose the songs. He refused when Naidu insisted that the songs had to be composed in a month. Hence, C. Ramchandra was signed on and the melodies were composed in record time. According to a book published by Raju Bharatan, Naidu requested Naushad to compose ten tunes within 30 days, for which he would get his "due payment". To this, Naushad purportedly said: "Naidusaab, yeh koi baniye ki dukaan samjha aapne? Ek gaana nahi milega aapko tees din main". (Naidusaab, do you think this is a baniya store? You will not get even one song in 30 days.)

References

External links
 

1955 films
1950s Hindi-language films
Films scored by C. Ramchandra
Hindi remakes of Tamil films
Films directed by S. M. Sriramulu Naidu
Indian action comedy films
1950s action comedy films
Indian black-and-white films